Psychic assault is a term used by academic legal writers as a synonym for assault (or common assault) in order to distinguish that offence from the related crime of battery and so avoid confusion. The need for this term arises from the fact that the word assault is frequently used to refer collectively both to that offence and to battery.

The word 'psychic' is used to denote the fact that the actus reus of the offence that is correctly described as assault consists of affecting the mind of the other person (whereas battery consists of the application of force).

References
Glanville Williams. Textbook of Criminal Law. Second Edition. 1983. Page 173.
R v Kerr [1988] 1 New Zealand Law Reports 270 at 273; [1987] NZCA 142; (1987) 2 CRNZ 407, Court of Appeal of New Zealand NZLII 
Claire de Than and Russell Heaton. Criminal Law. Third Edition. Oxford University Press. 2013. pp 90 & 91 et seq.
Horder, "Reconsidering Psychic Assault" [1998] Crim LR 392

Assault

sv:Psykisk misshandel